Windygates is a locality in south central Manitoba, Canada. It is located approximately 29 kilometers (18 miles) southwest of Morden, Manitoba near the Canada–United States border in the Municipality of Pembina.

See also
 List of regions of Manitoba
 List of rural municipalities in Manitoba
 Maida–Windygates Border Crossing

References 

Localities in Manitoba